Okara is an administrative subdivision (in Urdu a.k.a. tehsil) of Okara District in the Punjab province of Pakistan. It is administratively subdivided into 41 Union Councils, 11 of which form the Tehsil capital Okara.

References

Okara District
Tehsils of Punjab, Pakistan